Nioella sediminis is a Gram-negative, short-rod-shaped and non-motile  bacterium in the genus Nioella which has been isolated from sediments from the Jiulong River, China.

References

External links
Type strain of Nioella sediminis at BacDive -  the Bacterial Diversity Metadatabase

Rhodobacteraceae
Bacteria described in 2017